Adolfo Carlos Julio Schwelm-Cruz (28 June 1923 – 10 February 2012)  was a racing driver from Argentina.  He participated in one Formula One World Championship Grand Prix, on 18 January 1953.  He scored no championship points.

Complete Formula One World Championship results 
(key)

References

External links
Profile at www.grandprix.com

1923 births
2012 deaths
Racing drivers from Buenos Aires
Argentine racing drivers
Argentine Formula One drivers
Cooper Formula One drivers
Argentine people of German descent
World Sportscar Championship drivers